Northwell Health at Jones Beach Theater (commonly known as the Jones Beach Theater) is an outdoor amphitheatre at Jones Beach State Park in Wantagh, New York. It is one of two major outdoor arenas in the New York metropolitan area, along with PNC Bank Arts Center. The theater was designed to specifications provided by Robert Moses, who created Jones Beach State Park.

History

Opened in June 1952 as the New Jones Beach Marine Stadium, the venue originally had 8,200 seats and hosted musicals. Moses had several boxes designated for his own use, and Moses' friend Guy Lombardo performed often in the early years.

The opening show was the operetta extravaganza A Night in Venice by Johann Strauss II, produced by film producer Mike Todd, complete with floating gondolas and starring Enzo Stuarti, Thomas Hayward, Norwood Smith and Nola Fairbanks. During one of these Lombardo performances, the early phonograph recording star Billy Murray died of a heart attack in 1954.

Lombardo's final show was the 1977 production of Finian's Rainbow, with Christopher Hewett in the title role. After Lombardo's death in 1977, the series resumed in 1978 with Annie Get Your Gun, starring Lucie Arnaz. Beginning in the 1980s, the primary focus of the venue would change to concerts.

In 1991 and 1992, under contract from concert promoter Ron Delsener, the theatre underwent an extensive renovation, adding a second level and increasing the capacity to 11,200 seats. The capacity was expanded again in 1998 to hold 15,000 seats.

The theater's original design featured a moat; the stage was actually situated on Zachs Bay and was separated from the beach. Performers used an underwater tunnel that connected the main theatre to the stage or was brought to the stage by boat, and some scenes had floating scenery. Each night, Guy Lombardo would arrive in one of his luxurious speed boats, hop out and take his place in front of the orchestra and the show would start. The Guy Lombardo Orchestra would pass through the moat on a yacht during the intermissions and play tunes while floating in front of the audience. The moat was covered or filled in during the first renovation and seats were installed closer to the stage.

Today
In 2002, the company of clothing designer Tommy Hilfiger purchased the naming rights to the venue, renaming it "Tommy Hilfiger at Jones Beach Theater" for four years. On April 13, 2006, Tommy Hilfiger's company, under new ownership, declined its option to keep the company's name on the theater, and naming rights were purchased by the camera company Nikon, which renamed the venue "Nikon at Jones Beach Theater".

For a time the venue had a strict no-alcohol policy except in designated VIP boxes located behind the orchestra and the VIP tent area. Separate additional tickets are required to enter the popular VIP tent area. Starting in 2014, alcohol was available for sale to the general public during certain shows and, in 2015, was available for sale to the general public in regular concession stands during most shows.

In 2009, Jones Beach introduced The Bay Stage, which has a general admission capacity of 5,000. The performances are staged behind the concessions on the theater property. The theater property is located a short distance from the VIP area but The Bay Stage events cannot be viewed or heard from the VIP area. 

In October 2012, Hurricane Sandy did major damage to the theater. Various structures were destroyed and much of the lower part of the arena was flooded, including the lower section of seats which were flooded more than halfway up. The venue reopened on May 31, 2013, after a $20 million rehabilitation project.

Starting January 2017, Jones Beach Theater will undergo a million dollar renovation plan, including energy-efficient LED lighting, more cafes, larger concourses for less crowding and more.  Nikon's naming rights contract expired at the end of 2016, and in February 2017, New York health system Northwell Health purchased the naming rights to the venue, revealing the new name - "Northwell Health at Jones Beach Theater." The three-year deal includes an option for two additional years.

Among the most frequent performers at Jones Beach Theater are Jimmy Buffett, who has played the venue 30 times, James Taylor, and Aerosmith, who have played the venue 21 times.

See also
 List of contemporary amphitheatres

References

External links
 

1952 establishments in New York (state)
Amphitheaters in the United States
Event venues established in 1952
Robert Moses projects
Tourist attractions in Nassau County, New York
Tourist attractions on Long Island
Wantagh, New York